Eurybia macrophylla, commonly known as the bigleaf aster, large-leaved aster, largeleaf aster or  bigleaf wood aster, is an herbaceous perennial in the family Asteraceae that was formerly treated in the genus Aster. It is native to eastern North America, with a range extending from eastern and central  Canada (from Nova Scotia to Manitoba) through the northeastern  deciduous and mixed forests of New England and the Great Lakes region and south along the Appalachians as far as the northeastern corner of Georgia, and west as far as Minnesota, Missouri and Arkansas. The flowers appear in the late summer to early fall and show ray florets that are usually either a deep lavender or violet, but sometimes white, and disc florets that are cream-coloured or light yellow, becoming purple as they mature. It is one of the parent species of the hybrid Eurybia × herveyi.

Description 
Eurybia macrophylla is a perennial herbaceous plant with alternate, simple, toothed leaves. The basal leaves are large and heart-shaped, whereas the upper stem leaves are smaller and lance-shaped. The flowers form on flat-topped corymbs.

Distribution and habitat
Eurybia macrophylla is native to southern parts of eastern and central Canada and to northern parts of the eastern and central United States, south to northern Georgia in the Appalachian Mountains. In Canada, it is common in Manitoba, Ontario, Quebec, New Brunswick, Nova Scotia, and Prince Edward Island. In the United States, it can be found in all states east of and including Minnesota, Iowa, Illinois, Missouri and Tennessee. It may also be present in Mississippi. The plant has also been introduced outside of its native range into northern Europe. It is most often encountered at 0 to 1300 metre (0–4300 feet) elevations in moist to dry soils in association with hemlock–northern hardwood, beech–maple or pine forests, Appalachian spruce–fir forests, as well as with aspen, pine or open spruce woodlands. It can also be found in thickets, clearings or along shaded roadsides.

Conservation status within the United States
It is listed as endangered in Iowa and as a special concern in Rhode Island.

Uses
The large, thick young leaves can be cooked and eaten as greens.  The Algonquin people of Quebec use the leaves in this way.

The Iroquois use the root as a blood medicine, and they also use a compound decoction of the roots to loosen the bowels to treat venereal disease. The Ojibwa bathe their heads with an infusion of this plant to treat headaches. They also smoke it as hunting charm to attract deer. They consume the young leaves of the plant as both food and medicine, and use the roots to make soup.

References

Bibliography

External links
 Flora, fauna, earth, and sky... The natural history of the northwoods, Aster macrophyllus Large Leaf Aster
 Photo of herbarium specimen at Missouri Botanical Garden, collected in Missouri in 1984
 Photo of herbarium specimen at Missouri Botanical Garden, collected in North Carolina in 1897, isotype of Aster riciniatus, syn of Eurybia macrophylla

macrophylla
Plants used in Native American cuisine
Flora of North America
Plants used in traditional Native American medicine
Plants described in 1763